Michel Périn (born 20 May 1947) is a French former professional racing cyclist. He rode in seven editions of the Tour de France.

References

External links
 

1947 births
Living people
French male cyclists
People from Nérac
Sportspeople from Lot-et-Garonne
Cyclists from Nouvelle-Aquitaine